The Saint Croix Courier is a weekly newspaper published Tuesdays by the St. Croix Printing & Publishing Company, Limited in St. Stephen, New Brunswick, Canada. It was founded by David Main in October 1865.

On the St. Croix River, the newspaper covers Charlotte County, New Brunswick and Washington County, Maine. Since 2002, it has been part of the Advocate Printing & Publishing group of Pictou, Nova Scotia. The interim editor is Raissa Tetanish. The paper occasionally includes articles from other Advocate titles, local students, community members, and local journalism initiatives.

Previously, the paper was published alongside its sister publication, the Courier Weekend, which came out every Friday. The weekend edition ceased publication in 2020, citing the Coronavirus.

References
 Saint Croix Courier website

Weekly newspapers published in New Brunswick
St. Stephen, New Brunswick
Publications established in 1865
1865 establishments in New Brunswick